Llansanffraid and variant spellings of this Welsh place name may refer to:

 Llansantffraed, a parish and small settlement in Talybont-on-Usk, near Brecon, in Powys, Wales
 Llansantffraid, Ceredigion or Llansantffraed, a parish and village near Llanon in Ceredigion
 Llansantffraid Glyn Ceiriog, or Glyn Ceiriog, a village in Denbighshire
 Llansanffraid Glyndyfrdwy, a former parish in Denbighshire, Wales
 Llansantffraed, Monmouthshire, a parish and village near Raglan in Monmouthshire
 Llansantffraid railway station, a former station in Llansantffraid-ym-Mechain, Powys, Wales
 Llansantffraid-ym-Mechain, a village between Oswestry and Welshpool in Powys, Wales